The Wilfrid Laurier Golden Hawks football team represents Wilfrid Laurier University in Waterloo, Ontario in the sport of Canadian football in the Ontario University Athletics conference of U Sports. The Golden Hawks football team has been in continuous operation since 1961 and has been playing U Sports football (since re-named) in every year since 1962. The team has appeared in five Vanier Cup championships, losing in 1966, 1968 and 1972, and winning the national title in 1991 and 2005. The team has also won eight Yates Cup conference championships, most recently in 2016. The Golden Hawks have had one Hec Crighton Trophy winner, Bill Kubas, a former quarterback who won the award in 1994.

Recent history

Gary Jeffries era
Following the resignation of Rick Zmich, Gary Jeffries was appointed the team's manager of football operations and head coach on April 25, 2003 after also serving parts of the 2002 season as the acting head coach. After a 1–7 record in 2002, Jeffries led the Golden Hawks to a 6–2 record and a Yates Cup loss to the McMaster Marauders in his first year as head coach in 2003 where he was awarded the Frank Tindall Trophy as CIS football's head coach of the year.

In 2004, the Golden Hawks finished with an undefeated 8–0 record, which was the first time that the team had a perfect regular season record since the 1966 squad went 7–0. That year notably featured Laurier defeating the McMaster Marauders in the regular season, ending that program's 39-game regular season unbeaten streak. The Golden Hawks won their sixth Yates Cup championship by defeating those same Marauders, but lost the Uteck Bowl to the Laval Rouge et Or.

The Golden Hawks followed up their strong 2004 campaign with another 8–0 season in 2005, which was the first time that Laurier had back-to-back perfect regular season records. The team defeated the Western Mustangs in the Yates Cup to win the program's seventh conference championship and also claimed victory over the Acadia Axemen in the Uteck Bowl to qualify for their fifth Vanier Cup appearance. In the 41st Vanier Cup, the Golden Hawks defeated the Saskatchewan Huskies 24–23 after placekicker Brian Devlin connected on a 32-yard field goal with 19 seconds remaining in the game. The Golden Hawks became the first team in program history and the 10th team in Canadian University history to finish a season with an undefeated record, going 12-0. The Vanier Cup win was the second and the most recent in program history.

Overall, under Jeffries, the program was one of the strongest in the OUA, as they had always finished in the top three in the ten-team conference from 2003 to 2009. The Golden Hawks had seven straight seasons of at least six wins between 2003 and 2009, but had back-to-back .500 seasons in 2010 and 2011. While the team had a four win season in 2010, they forfeited a game they won against the Toronto Varsity Blues for using an ineligible player. The Golden Hawks finished with a losing record in 2012 for the first time since Jeffries had taken over as head coach.

Jeffries announced his resignation as the manager of football operations and head coach on November 1, 2012, leaving the program with the second-most wins as football coach in school history. Overall, he had compiled a regular season record of 58 wins and 22 losses as well as an 11–9 record in the post-season.

Michael Faulds era
Former Mustangs quarterback Michael Faulds was hired as the team's head coach, the sixth in program history, on January 8, 2013. In Faulds' first season in 2013, the Golden Hawks missed the playoffs for the first time since 2002, but rebounded with a sixth-place finish, a 4–4 record, and a playoff berth in both the 2014 and 2015 seasons.

In 2016, the Golden Hawks finished with a dominant 7–1 record, losing only to the Western Mustangs who also finished 7–1, which was their best record since 2007. That year, the team won the program's eighth Yates Cup by defeating the Mustangs 43–40 in the 109th Yates Cup game, which was also the largest fourth quarter comeback in Yates Cup history as the Golden Hawks trailed 40–19 early in the fourth quarter. While the team lost the Uteck Bowl to the Laval Rouge et Or, Faulds was named the U Sports Head Coach of the Year and four Golden Hawks were named U Sports All-Canadians.

Building on the success of the 2016 season, the Golden Hawks finished with a 6–2 record in 2017 and a second consecutive second place finish in the regular season. While the team qualified for the Yates Cup again, the team was hammered by the eventual Vanier Cup champion Western Mustangs by a score of 75–32. In 2018, the team finished with a 4–4 record and a seventh place finish after losing the tie-breaker with the Waterloo Warriors, whom they had lost to earlier in the season for the first time since 2002. The 2019 season ended much the same as the team finished with a 4–4 record, but lost the last game of the season and finished in seventh place due to tie-breakers with Waterloo and Carleton.

Recent season-by-season record
The following is the record of the Wilfrid Laurier Golden Hawks football team since 1999:

National award winners
Hec Crighton Trophy: Bill Kubas (1994)
J. P. Metras Trophy: Veron Stiliadis (1988), Scott Evans (2007)
Presidents' Trophy: Rich Payne (1980)
Peter Gorman Trophy: Jim Reid (1976), Paul Nastasiuk (1983), Bill Kubas (1990)
Russ Jackson Award: Josh Alexander (2001), Dillon Heap (2011)
Frank Tindall Trophy: David "Tuffy" Knight (1972, 1979), Rich Newbrough (1991), Rick Zmich (1995), Gary Jeffries (2003), Michael Faulds (2016)

Wilfrid Laurier Golden Hawks in the CFL

As of the end of the 2022 CFL season, 17 former Golden Hawks players were on CFL teams' rosters:
Sam Acheampong, Toronto Argonauts
Chris Ackie, Montreal Alouettes
Bryce Bell, Calgary Stampeders
Kwaku Boateng, Ottawa Redblacks
Tommy Bringi, Saskatchewan Roughriders
Tanner Cadwallader, Winnipeg Blue Bombers
Brandon Calver, Toronto Argonauts
Brad Cowan, Calgary Stampeders
Kurleigh Gittens Jr., Toronto Argonauts
Isaiah Guzylak-Messam, BC Lions
Scott Hutter, Edmonton Elks
Ese Mrabure-Ajufo, Edmonton Elks
Braydon Noll, Toronto Argonauts
Godfrey Onyeka, Saskatchewan Roughriders
Robbie Smith, Toronto Argonauts
Malcolm Thompson, Winnipeg Blue Bombers
Mario Villamizar, BC Lions

References

External links
 Wilfrid Laurier University football

 
U Sports teams
U Sports football teams
Golden Hawks
Sport in Waterloo, Ontario
Wilfrid Laurier Golden Hawks